To Terrapin: Hartford '77 is a live album by the American rock band the Grateful Dead.  It was recorded at the Hartford Civic Center in Hartford, Connecticut, on May 28, 1977, the last show of the band's 26-date East Coast tour in the spring of 1977.  It was released by Rhino Records on April 7, 2009.

Track listing

Disc one
First set:
"Bertha" > (Jerry Garcia, Robert Hunter) - 6:46
"Good Lovin'" > (Artie Resnick, Rudy Clark) - 5:34
"Sugaree" (Garcia, Hunter) - 19:18
"Jack Straw" (Bob Weir, Hunter) - 6:23
"Row Jimmy" (Garcia, Hunter) - 10:43

Disc two
First set, continued:
"New Minglewood Blues" (Noah Lewis) - 6:37
"Candyman" (Garcia, Hunter) - 7:04
"Passenger" (Phil Lesh, Peter Monk) - 3:40
"Brown-Eyed Women" (Garcia, Hunter) - 6:12
"Promised Land" (Chuck Berry) - 4:26
Second set:
"Samson and Delilah" (traditional, arr. Weir) - 8:05
"Tennessee Jed" (Garcia, Hunter) - 9:04

Disc three
Second set, continued:
"Estimated Prophet" > (John Perry Barlow, Weir) - 11:35
"Playing in the Band" > (Hunter, Mickey Hart, Weir) - 10:59
"Terrapin Station" > (Garcia, Hunter) - 11:06
"Drums" > (Hart, Bill Kreutzmann) - 1:30
"Not Fade Away" > (Buddy Holly, Norman Petty) - 15:11
"Wharf Rat" > (Hunter, Garcia) - 10:18
"Playing in the Band" (Hunter, Hart, Weir) - 6:42
"One More Saturday Night" (Weir) - 5:20
Encore:
"U.S. Blues" (Garcia, Hunter)  - 6:47

Personnel

Musicians
Jerry Garcia – guitar, vocals
Donna Godchaux – vocals
Keith Godchaux – piano
Mickey Hart – drums
Bill Kreutzmann – drums
Phil Lesh – electric bass
Bob Weir – guitar, vocals

Production

 Produced for release by David Lemieux
 Recorded by Betty Cantor-Jackson
 CD Mastering by Jeffrey Norman at Garage Audio Mastering, Petaluma CA
 Cover art by Scott McDougall
 Art direction and design by Steve Vance

References

Grateful Dead live albums
2009 live albums
Rhino Entertainment live albums